Serratovolva is a genus of sea snails, marine gastropod mollusks in the subfamily Eocypraeinae  of the family Ovulidae.

Species
Species within the genus Serratovolva include:
Serratovolva dondani (Cate, 1964)
Serratovolva luteocincta Celzard, 2008
Serratovolva minabeensis Cate, 1975

References

Ovulidae